Belén Maya (born 1966) is a Spanish flamenco dancer, choreographer and educator.

She is the daughter of Mario Maya, a Romani man considered one of the most innovative flamenco dancers in Spanish history and Carmen Mora, also a flamenco dancer. She was born in New York City while her parents were on tour performing. Maya began dancing while still young and studied classical, Hindu and contemporary dance in Italy, Germany and England. She also studied at the Amor de Dios school in Madrid with teachers including Paco Fernández, Goyo Montero, Carmen Cortés, Paco Romero and Rosa Naranjo. She joined the Spanish National Ballet, later joining her father's company. She then formed her own company, going on tour in Japan; she next joined the Andalusian Dance Company. 

In 1995 she was chosen to be the head of "Flamenco", a documentary by Carlos Saura. The director chose Belén Maya as one of the representatives of the new aesthetics of flamenco. This movie, original name "Flamand", was a notable film in the filmography of the flamenco song form, the cante jondo, which had its premiere.

Carlos said, 'it doesn't seem like flamenco,' which is why he justified the choice to put her on the film's promotional poster. Evers since, Maya became an icon of cutting-edge flamenco dance.

In 1997, she formed a company with singer Mayte Martín which performed at major festivals in 2002 and 2003.

She continued to perform, also studying with Juan Carlos Lérida. 

In 2014, her show Los Invitados received the Critic's Award at the Festival de Jerez. In 2015, she was chosen as the best dancer at the Premios Flamenco Hoy by the Crítica Nacional de Flamenco.

Maya recently stopped performing to focus on lectures on contemporary flamenco and gender issues, particularly in the United States.

References 

1966 births
Living people
Spanish female dancers
Spanish choreographers
Flamenco dancers